Politics of Morocco take place in a framework of an official parliamentary constitutional monarchy, whereby the prime minister of Morocco is the head of government, and of a  multi-party system. Executive power is exercised by the government. Legislative power is vested in both the government and the two chambers of parliament, the Assembly of Representatives of Morocco and the Assembly of Councillors. The Moroccan Constitution provides for a monarchy with a Parliament and an independent judiciary.

On June 17, 2011, King Mohammed VI announced a series of reforms that would transform Morocco into a constitutional monarchy. However, criticizing or directly opposing the king is still punishable with prison.

Executive branch

|King
|Mohammed VI
|
|23 July 1999
|-
|Prime Minister
|Aziz Akhannouch
|RNI
|10 September 2021
|}
The constitution grants the king extensive powers; he is both the secular political leader and the "Commander of the Faithful" as a direct descendant of the Prophet Mohammed. He presides over the Council of Ministers; appoints the prime minister following legislative elections, and on recommendations from the latter, appoints the members of the government. While the constitution theoretically allows the king to terminate the tenure of any minister, and after consultation with the heads of the higher and lower Assemblies, to dissolve the Parliament, suspend the constitution, call for new elections, or rule by decree, the only time this happened was in 1965. The King is formally the chief of the military. Upon the death of his father Mohammed V, King Hassan II succeeded to the throne in 1961. He ruled Morocco for the next 38 years until he died in 1999. His son, the King Mohammed VI, assumed the throne in July 1999.

Following the March 1998 elections, a coalition government headed by opposition socialist Abderrahmane Youssoufi and composed largely of ministers drawn from opposition parties, was formed. Prime Minister Youssoufi's government is the first government drawn primarily from opposition parties in decades, and also represents the first opportunity for a coalition of socialist, left-of-centre, and nationalist parties to be included in the government until October 2002. It was also the first time in the modern political history of the Arab world that the opposition assumed power following an election. The current government is headed by Aziz Akhannouch, who was appointed by King Mohammed VI after his party won a plurality of seats in the September 2021 general election. His cabinet was sworn in on 7 October.

Legislative branch

Since the constitutional reform of 1996, the bicameral legislature consists of two chambers. The Assembly of Representatives of Morocco (Majlis al-Nuwab/Assemblée des Répresentants) has 325 members elected for a five-year term, 295 elected in multi-seat constituencies and 30 in national lists consisting only of women. The Assembly of Councillors (Majlis al-Mustasharin) has 270 members, elected for a nine-year term, elected by local councils (162 seats), professional chambers (91 seats) and wage-earners (27 seats). 
The Parliament's powers, though limited, were expanded under the 1992 and 1996 constitutional revisions and include budgetary matters, approving bills, questioning ministers, and establishing ad hoc commissions of inquiry to investigate the government's actions. The lower chamber of Parliament may dissolve the government through a vote of no confidence.

Political parties and elections

On 26 November 2011, the initial results of the parliamentary elections were released. The moderate Islamist party, the Justice and Development Party (PJD), was projected to win the largest number of seats. However, the electoral rules were structured such that no political party could win more than 20 percent of the seats in the parliament.

The Justice and Development Party (PJD) remained the largest party, winning 125 of the 395 seats in the House of Representatives, a gain of 18 seats compared to the 2011 elections. Abdelillah Benkirane was reappointed Prime Minister by the King on 10 October. The Authenticity and Modernity Party (PAM) won 102 seats, and the rest of the seats were split among smaller parties.

In the September 2021 general election, the moderate Islamist PJD suffered an electoral wipeout, with the liberal National Rally of Independents becoming the largest party in Parliament. Its leader, Aziz Akhannouch, subsequently formed a coalition government with the Authenticity and Modernity Party and Istiqlal Party.

Judicial branch

The highest court in the judicial structure is the Supreme Court, whose judges are appointed by the King. The Youssoufi government continued to implement a reform program to develop greater judicial independence and impartiality.

Administrative divisions
Since 2015 Morocco officially administers 12 regions: Béni Mellal-Khénifra, Casablanca-Settat, Dakhla-Oued Ed-Dahab, Drâa-Tafilalet, Fès-Meknès, Guelmim-Oued Noun, Laâyoune-Sakia El Hamra, Marrakech-Safi, Oriental, Rabat-Salé-Kénitra, Souss-Massa and Tanger-Tetouan-Al Hoceima. The regions are administered by Walis and governors appointed by the King.

Morocco is divided also into 13 prefectures and 62 provinces. Prefectures: Agadir-Ida Ou Tanane, Casablanca, Fès, Inezgane-Aït Melloul, Marrakesh, Meknès, Mohammedia, Oujda-Angad, Rabat, Safi, Salé, Skhirate-Témara and Tangier-Assilah.
Provinces: Al Haouz, Al Hoceïma, Aousserd, Assa-Zag, Azilal, Benslimane, Béni-Mellal, Berkane, Berrechid, Boujdour, Boulemane, Chefchaouen, Chichaoua, Chtouka Aït Baha, Driouch, El Hajeb, El Jadida, El Kelâa des Sraghna, Errachidia, Es Semara, Essaouira, Fahs-Anjra, Figuig, Fquih Ben Salah, Guelmim, Guercif, Ifrane, Jerada, Kénitra, Khémisset, Khénifra, Khouribga, Laâyoune, Larache, Médiouna, Midelt, Moulay Yacoub, Nador, Nouaceur, Ouarzazate, Oued Ed-Dahab, Ouezzane, Rehamna, Safi, Sefrou, Settat, Sidi Bennour, Sidi Ifni, Sidi Kacem, Sidi Slimane, Tan-Tan, Taounate, Taourirt, Tarfaya, Taroudannt, Tata, Taza, Tétouan, Tinghir, Tiznit, Youssoufia and Zagora.

International organization affiliations
ABEDA, ACCT (associate), AfDB, AFESD, AL, AMF, AMU, EBRD, ECA, FAO, G-77, IAEA, IBRD, ICAO, ICCt, ICFTU, ICRM, IDA, IDB, IFAD, IFC, IFRCS, IHO (pending member), ILO, IMF, IMO, Intelsat, Interpol, IOC, IOM, ISO, ITF, ITU, NAM, OAS (observer), OIC, OPCW, OSCE (partner), UN, UNCTAD, UNESCO, UNHCR, UNIDO, UPU, WCO, WHO, WIPO, WMO, WToO, WTrO.

Notable persons
 

Ahmed Ameziane,  politician

References

External links
Government at the official portal of Morocco
Morocco list at the CIA Chiefs of State and Cabinet Members, March 17, 2011